Oxspring railway station was a short lived station built by the Sheffield, Ashton-under-Lyne and Manchester Railway to serve the village of Oxspring, South Yorkshire, England. The station opened on 5 December 1845 but due to cost-cutting measures it was closed, along with Dukinfield Dog Lane, Hazelhead and Thurgoland, on 5 November 1847.

References 
 Dow, George. "Geat Central Volume 1" (The Progenitors, 1813 - 1865)
 "A Railway Chronology of the Sheffield Area", Edited by Richard V. Proctor, Sheffield City Libraries, 1975.  

Disused railway stations in Barnsley
Woodhead Line
Railway stations in Great Britain opened in 1845
Railway stations in Great Britain closed in 1847